Hyphoporus nilghiricus, is a species of predaceous diving beetle found in India, Pakistan, and Sri Lanka. Sometimes, the species is included into the genus Hygrotus by some authors.

References 

Dytiscidae
Insects of Sri Lanka
Insects described in 1903